Bordj El Bahri is a municipality of the city of Algiers in northern Algeria. Bordj El Bahri is on the peninsula that forms the eastern side of Algiers Bay.

Notable people

Communes of Algiers Province
Algiers Province